Thomas Muster was the defending champion, but lost in the quarterfinals to Guillermo Pérez Roldán.

Miloslav Mečíř won the title by defeating Pérez Roldán 6–4, 1–6, 6–3, 6–2 in the final.

Seeds

Draw

Finals

Top half

Bottom half

References

External links
 Official results archive (ATP)
 Official results archive (ITF)

Singles